Maa-alused (Estonian mythology) – Subterranean spirit
 Machlyes (Medieval bestiaries) – Hermaphroditic humanoid
 Macrocephali (Medieval bestiaries) – Giant-headed humanoid
Madam Koi Koi (West African Mythology ) – Female ghost 
 Madremonte (Colombian folklore) – Nature guardian
 Maero (Māori) – Savage, arboreal humanoids
 Magog (English folklore) – Giant protector of London
 Maha-pudma (Hindu mythology) – Giant elephant that holds up the world
 Mairu (Basque mythology) – Megalith-building giant
 Mājas gari (Latvian mythology) – Benevolent house spirit
 Majitu – in Swahili mythology, shape-shifting spirits that can pass as humans 
 Makara (Indian mythology) – Aquatic beings 
 Makura-gaeshi (Japanese mythology) – Pillow-moving spirit
 Mallt-y-Nos (Welsh mythology) – Spirit of the hunt
 Mami Wata (Africa and the African diaspora) – Supernaturally beautiful water spirits
 Manananggal (Philippine mythology) – Vampires that sever their torsos from their legs to fly around
 Mandi (Medieval bestiaries) – Humanoid with a forty-year lifespan
 Mandrake (Medieval folklore) – Diminutive, animated construct
 Manes (Roman mythology) – Ancestral spirits
 Mannegishi (Cree) – Little people with six fingers and no noses
 Manticore (Persian mythology) – Lion-human-scorpion hybrid
 Mapinguari (Brazilian mythology) – Giant sloth
 Mara (Scandinavian folklore) – Female night-demon
 Marabbecca (Italian folklore) – Malevolent water spirit
 Mare (Germanic and Slavic folklore) – Malicious entity of dream.
 Mareikura (Tuamotu) – Attendant of Kiho-tumu, the supreme god
 Mares of Diomedes (Greek mythology) – Man-eating horses
 Marid (Arabian mythology) – Jinn associated fortune tellers
 Marmennill (Norse mythology) – Mermen with prophetic abilities
 Maro deivės (Lithuanian mythology) – Disease spirits
 Maski-mon-gwe-zo-os (Abenaki mythology) – Shapeshifting toad spirit
 Matagot (French mythology) – Spirit that takes animal form; usually that of a black cat
 Matsya (Hindu mythology) – First Avatar of Vishnu in the form of a half-fish and half-man
 Mayura (Hindu mythology) – Peacock spirit
 Mazzikin (Jewish mythology) – Invisible, malevolent spirit
 Mbói Tu'ĩ (Guaraní mythology) – Snake-parrot hybrid
 Mbwiri (Central Africa) – Possessing demon
 Medusa (Greek mythology) – Serpent-female hybrid (Gorgon) with numerous snake heads
Melek Taus- biblical bird
 Meliae (Greek mythology) – Ash tree nymph
 Melusine (Medieval folklore) – Female water spirit, with the form of a winged mermaid or serpent
 Menehune (Hawaiian mythology) – Little people and craftsmen
 Menninkäinen (Finnish mythology) – Little people and nature spirits
 Merlion (Singapore) – Combination of a lion and a fish, the symbol of Singapore
 Mermaid/Merman (multiple cultures) – Human-fish hybrid
 Merlin (English mythology) – Elderly wizard
 Merrow (Irish mythology and Scottish) – Human-fish hybrid
 Metee-kolen-ol (Abenaki mythology) – Ice-hearted wizards
 Mimi (Australian Aboriginal mythology) – Extremely elongated humanoid that has to live in rock crevasses to avoid blowing away
 Minka Bird (Australian Aboriginal mythology) – Death spirit
 Minokawa (Philippine) – Giant swallow
 Minotaur (Greek mythology) – Human-bull hybrid
 Mishibizhiw (Ojibwa) – Feline water spirit
 Misi-ginebig (Ojibwa) – Serpentine rain spirit
 Misi-kinepikw (Cree) – Serpentine rain spirit
 Mizuchi (Japanese mythology) – Water dragon
 Mogwai (Chinese mythology) – Vengeful ghost or demon
 Mohan (Latin American folklore) – Nature spirit
 Mokèlé-mbèmbé (Congo) – Water-dwelling creature
 Mokoi (Australian Aboriginal mythology) – Malevolent spirit that kills sorcerers
 Mokorea (Polynesian mythology) – Amphibious humanoid living in the spirit world (underground world)
 Moñái (Guaraní mythology) – Giant snake with antennae
 Monocerus (Medieval bestiaries) – One-horned stag-horse-elephant-boar hybrid, sometimes treated as distinct from the unicorn
 Mono Grande (South America) – Giant monkey
 Monopod (Medieval bestiaries) – Dwarf with one giant foot
 Mooinjer veggey (Manx folklore) – Nature spirit
 Moon rabbit (Far Eastern folklore) – Legendary animal
 Mora (Slavic mythology) – Disembodied spirit
 Morgens (Breton and Welsh mythology) – Water spirits
 Morinji-no-okama (Japanese mythology) – Animated tea kettle
 Mormolykeia (Greek) – Underworld spirit
 Moroi (Romanian) – Vampiric ghost
 Mo-sin-a (Taiwanese folklore) – Mountain demon
 Moss people (Continental Germanic mythology) – Little people and tree spirits
 Mothman (American folklore) – Large grey winged humanoid with glowing red eyes
 Mugwump (Canadian folklore) – Fish-like lake monster
 Mujina (Japanese mythology) – Shapeshifting badger spirit
 Muldjewangk (Australian Aboriginal mythology) – Water monster
 Multo (Philippine mythology) – Spirit of a deceased person seeking justice or has unfinished business
 Mummy (Egyptian) – Undead creature who revives
 Muma Pădurii (Romanian folklore) – Forest-dwelling hag
 Mungoon-Gali (Australian Aboriginal) – Giant goanna
 Muscaliet (Medieval bestiaries) – Hare-squirrel-boar hybrid that has an intense body heat
 Muse (Greek mythology) – Spirits that inspire artists
 Mushusshu (Mesopotamian mythology)
 Musimon (Heraldic) – Sheep-goat hybrid
 Myling (Scandinavian folklore) – Ghosts of unbaptized children
 Myrmecoleon (Medieval bestiaries) – Ant-lion hybrid

References for M 

M